MV Tecumseh is a bulk carrier owned and operated by Canadian shipping firm Lower Lakes Towing. It was built in 1973 as Sugar Islander in Seattle, Washington for the Bankers Trust Company, which sold the but later was purchased and operated by other companies. In 1995, the ship was renamed Islander, followed by Judy Litrico in 1996. In 2008, the name changed again to Trina Litrico before being sold to Lower Lakes Towing in 2011. The ship operates on the Great Lakes primarily transporting grain. In 2019, Tecumseh suffered an engine fire that left the ship out of control on the Detroit River.

Description
The ship is powered by two  SEMT Pielstick 12PC-CV-400 diesel engines turning one shaft.

Construction and career
The ship was constructed by Lockheed Shipbuilding & Engineering Company at Seattle, Washington for the Bankers Trust Company and was launched on 22 August 1972. Named Sugar Islander, the vessel was completed in August 1973 and registered in New Orleans, Louisiana. In 1995, the ship was acquired by Islander Shipholding and renamed Islander, before they changed it to Judy Litrico the following year. In 1998, Judy Litrico was acquired by US United Ocean Services LLC. They renamed the ship Tina Litrico in 2006. When purchased by the Lower Lakes Towing Company in 2011, it was renamed Tecumseh and re-registered at Port Dover, Ontario. The ship underwent a refit at Veracruz, Mexico before sailing to the Great Lakes. Tecumseh arrived at Montreal, Quebec on 29 December 2011 where it was fitted with Port Colborne fairleads from the scrapped . Since entering service on the Great Lakes, the bulk carrier is primarily used to transport grains.

On 15 December 2019, the 16 crewmembers aboard Tecumseh were taken off the ship after a fire broke out in the engine room. The ship had been travelling from Thunder Bay, Ontario, Ontario to Windsor, Ontario carrying a load of canola. The United States Coast Guard responded to the fire, which happened off Zug Island in the Detroit River, on the United States side. The vessel, out of control, then drifted over to the Canadian side of the river. The ship was anchored on the Canadian side near Windsor.

Citations

Sources
 
 
 

Great Lakes freighters
1972 ships
Ships built by Lockheed Shipbuilding and Construction Company
Merchant ships of Canada
Merchant ships of the United States